"Prometheus" (German: "Prometheus") is a short story by Franz Kafka written between 1917 and 1923, likely in 1918. The story presents four versions of the myth of Prometheus, concerning his fate after he was chained to a cliff for betraying the secrets of the gods to men. It was not published in Kafka's lifetime, first appearing in Beim Bau der Chinesischen Mauer (1931). The first English translation by Willa and Edwin Muir was published by Martin Secker in London in 1933. It appeared in The Great Wall of China. Stories and Reflections (New York City: Schocken Books, 1946).

References

 Kafka, Franz. The Complete Stories. New York City: Schocken Books, 1995.

Short stories by Franz Kafka
Short stories published posthumously
Prometheus
Classical mythology in popular culture